Albums entitled Live, or similar titles, listed alphabetically by band name or artist's last name, include:

0–9
 Live by 311

A 
 ABBA Live by ABBA
 Live by AC/DC
 Live by Alice in Chains
 Live by All Sons & Daughters
 America Live by America
 Live by Angel Witch
 Live by Apocalyptica
 Live! by April Wine

B 
 Live by Bad Brains
 Live by Erykah Badu
 Live by Bang Tango
 Live by Barclay James Harvest
 Live! by the Beau Brummels
 Live EP by Breaking Benjamin
 Live! by Chuck Berry
 Live by the Black Crowes
 Live! by Carla Bley
 Live by Blind Guardian
 Live by Blondie
 Live by the Bouncing Souls
 Live by Built to Spill
 Live by Burning Spear
 Live by Terence Blanchard

C 
 Live by Candlemass
Cardiacs Live by Cardiacs
 Catch 22 Live by Catch 22
 Live by Champion
 Ray Charles Live by Ray Charles
 Live by Chizh & Co
 Live by City and Colour
 Gary Clark Jr. Live by Gary Clark Jr.
 Live by Clouseau
 Live by Corneille
 Live! by Billy "Crash" Craddock
 LIVE! by Crush 40

D 
Alive 1997 by Daft Punk
 Alive 2007 by Daft Punk
 Live by DecembeRadio
 Live by Deftones
 Live by the Dubliners
 Live! by Dune

E 

 Live! by Jonathan Edwards
 Live by Eurythmics

F 
 Live by Face to Face
 Live by Five.Bolt.Main
 Live by Fleetwood Mac
 Live! by Frank Gambale

G 
 Marvin Gaye Live! by Marvin Gaye
 Live by Generation X
 Genesis Live by Genesis
 Live by Gipsy Kings
 Live by Golden Earring
 Live/Dead by Grateful Dead
 Live by the Group (Ahmed Abdullah, Marion Brown, Billy Bang, Sirone, Fred Hopkins, Andrew Cyrille)
 Live!! by Guitar Wolf

H 
 Live by Happy Mondays
 Live!, by Huck-A-Bucks
 Live by Donny Hathaway
 Live! by Scott Henderson
 Live by Terri Hendrix
 Live! by Terumasa Hino

I 

 Live by Iron Butterfly
 Live!! +one by Iron Maiden
 Live! by the Isley Brothers

J 
 Live by the Jacksons
 Live by Jesus Jones
 Live by Jonas Brothers 
 Live by J. Cole

K 
 Live by Kaipa
 Live! by Kasabian
 Live by Kix
 Live by Klinik
 Live! by Habib Koité and Bamada
 Live by Korn
 Live by Alison Krauss & Union Station
 Live! by Fela Kuti

L 

 Live by Luciano

M 

 Live by Natalie MacMaster
 Live by the Mars Volta
 Masta Killa Live by Masta Killa
 Live! by Bob Marley and the Wailers
 Sarah McLachlan Live by Sarah McLachlan
 Live by Metal Church
 Live! by the Monkees
 Live! by Vinnie Moore
 Live at Rome Olympic Stadium  by Muse

N 
 live by Ednita Nazario
 Nena Live (1995) by Nena
 Nena Live (1998) by Nena
 Nena Live Nena by Nena
 Live by New Riders of the Purple Sage
 Live by News
 Live by the Northern Pikes
 Live by Tig Notaro
 Live by Michael Nyman

O 
 Live by the Only Ones
 Live by Our Lady Peace

P 
 Live by Vanessa Paradis
 Live! by Patti LaBelle
 Live! One Night Only by Patti LaBelle
 Live by Peatbog Faeries
 Live by Poco
 Live! by the Police
 Live by Pigmy Love Circus
 Live by Pokolgép

R 

 R.E.M. Live by R.E.M.
 Live by Return to Forever
 Live by Reverend
 Live by Robert Rich
 Live by Roxus
 Live by Roswell Rudd and Duck Baker
 Live by Running Wild

S 

 Live by Sade
 Live by Saint Vitus
 Live! by Irène Schweizer and Joey Baron
 Live by Sensational Alex Harvey Band
 Live by Sedes
 Live! by Selena
 Shania Twain Live by Shania Twain
 Show of Hands Live by Show of Hands
 Pacifier Live by Shihad (as Pacifier)
 Live by Sleepytime Gorilla Museum
 Live! by Lonnie Liston Smith
 Live by the Smithereens
 Live by Soft Cell
 Live by the Sounds
 Live by Split Lip Rayfield
 Live! by Status Quo
 Steve Miller Band Live! by Steve Miller Band
 Live by Sunny Day Real Estate
 Live by Sweetbox
 Switchfoot: Live – EP by Switchfoot

T 

 Live by James Taylor
 Live by They Might Be Giants (1999)
 Life/Live by Thin Lizzy
 Live by Thunder
 Trapt Live! by Trapt
 Live by Lela Tsurtsumia
 Live by Tanya Tucker
 Tina Live by Tina Turner
 Live by Trouble Funk

U 

 Live by Usher

V 
 Anna Vissi Live by Anna Vissi (2004)
 Live! by Anna Vissi (1993)

W 

 Live by Bob Weir and Rob Wasserman
 Live by Włochaty

Y 
 Live by YU grupa

Z 
 Live by Zebra

See also
Greatest Hits Live (disambiguation)
Live on Stage (disambiguation)
Live at the Fillmore
Lists of albums

Notes

References

Live